Rosaline Greene was an American actress known as "the girl with the most beautiful speaking voice on the air". By November 1935, she had portrayed more characters than any other woman on the radio.

Early years
Greene's home town was Bay Shore, New York. She was an honor graduate of the New York State College for Teachers. Following her graduation, she taught at Hamilton Range School.

Career

WGY Players
When Greene was 18 years old and a college student, Her professional debut as an actress came on radio. She was selected to be a member of the WGY Players although she "had never been on a stage and could not 'project'". That company presented a full-length production of Eugene Walter's The Wolf on August 3, 1922, and in September the group began performing a new play on WGY each Friday night, averaging 2.5 hours in length. By April 1924, WGY plays were extended via network connections to audiences in Washington, D. C., and New York City (over WRC and WJZ, respectively). Greene was the troupe's leading lady, earning $5 per week.

One of Greene's performances on WGY led to a theatrical opportunity in New York City. Max Marcin heard the Players' presentation of his play Silence with Greene in the leading role and "was so impressed by Miss Greene's interpretation of the part that after an interview she was engaged to understudy the leading lady in the New York company."

Other radio
After Greene left WGY, she worked at WOR radio where, in addition to her acting, she formed the Rosaline Greene Players and directed the ensemble of "college graduates, young and experienced professionals" as they acted on radio. On network radio, Greene was mistress of ceremonies on The Hour of Charm. On Maxwell House Show Boat, she acted the role of Mary Lou, and Muriel Wilson sang Mary Lou's songs. Greene portrayed Joyce Carraway on Stories of the Black Chamber and Peggy on Peggy's Doctor. Other radio programs on which Greene performed included Grand Central Station, Ziegfeld Follies, Portia Faces Life and The Eveready Hour. Her debut on The Eveready Hour was in the title role of a production of "Joan of Arc" on November 13, 1928.

Personal life
Greene was married to Joseph Barnett, an executive in radio.

Recognition
In 1926, while Greene was a member of the WGY Players, she won a contest at the Radio World's Fair at Madison Square Garden to be designated possessor of "The Perfect Radio Voice".

References 

20th-century American actresses
Actresses from New York (state)
American radio actresses
American soap opera actresses
Year of birth missing
Year of death missing
People from Bay Shore, New York
University at Albany, SUNY alumni